Interstate 369 (I-369) is a north–south Interstate spur route running through Northeast Texas. Once complete, the freeway will begin at an interchange with I-69/U.S. Highway 84 (US 84) east of Tenaha and head northward to Carthage, Marshall, Jefferson, and Atlanta before terminating at an interchange with I-49/US 59/US 71 north of Texarkana. For its entire length, I-369 will share its alignment with US 59.

Route description
I-369 currently begins at US 59/Loop 151 and goes 3 miles north where it currently ends at I-30. 

Plans call for I-369 to begin at US 59/84/Future I-69 in Tenaha then head north serving Carthage, Marshall, Jefferson, and Atlanta before entering Texarkana where it crosses I-30 then extends northward to an interchange with I-49 where I-369 will end.

History
At its meeting on November 15, 2012, the American Association of State Highway and Transportation Officials (AASHTO) approved a  highway to be numbered I-369, to connect I-69 in Tenaha to I-30 in Texarkana. The Federal Highway Administration (FHWA) approved the designation on May 24, 2013, and the Texas Transportation Commission followed suit on May 30, 2013. This action also finalized the designations of other Interstates in Texas. This action meant that the Texas Department of Transportation (TxDOT) could commence the signing of I-369, as well as the other route segments cited, at their discretion. The signage was installed and revealed on September 23, 2013. New signage that included exit numbers and mileposts corresponding to the whole proposed length was installed the week of June 22, 2020.

Future
The status of the Texarkana to Tenaha segment is unfinished; it is currently only in the planning and development stage. The proposed route of I-369 is to go from State Highway Loop 151 (Loop 151) in Texarkana, following US 59 to the junction of US 59/US 84/future I-69 in Tenaha. It may also be extended north from its current terminus at I-30 to a future interchange with I-49 north of Texarkana, which would be about  when completed.

A proposed route of I-369 in the Marshall area has the Interstate running east of the city and using part of the existing Loop 390 corridor. Loop 390 will be extended south from US 80 east of Marshall southward to I-20 and will be built to Interstate standards in anticipation of a future I-369 designation. Construction is slated to begin in 2025. Construction will likely be done in phases. Not all of the new roadways will be built at the same time. It is planned to go further south to reconnect back to the current US 59. The roadway north of US 80 will eventually be upgraded. US 59 at FM 1794 is planned to be upgraded to a grade separation.

Exit list

See also

References

External links

 I-369 at AARoad's Interstate Guide

69-3
69-3
3 (Texas)
U.S. Route 59

Transportation in Bowie County, Texas